Chrysophyllum flexuosum is a tree species in the family Sapotaceae found in Brazil.

It is listed in the IUCN Red List conservation dependent species.

Triterpenic lactones can be found in the leaves of C. flexuosum.

References

External links 
Isotype at the herbarium of Muséum National d'Histoire Naturelle, Paris

flexuosum
Flora of the Atlantic Forest
Trees of Brazil
Flora of Bahia
Flora of Minas Gerais
Flora of Rio de Janeiro (state)
Flora of São Paulo (state)
Plants described in 1837
Least concern plants